Forbidden Jungle is a 1950 American adventure film directed by Robert Emmett Tansey and written by Frances Kavanaugh. The film stars Don C. Harvey, Forrest Taylor, Alyce Louis and Robert Cabal. The film was released on March 2, 1950, by Eagle-Lion Films.

Plot
An American big game hunter is asked to search for a white boy that's rumored to be missing deep in the jungle.

Cast          
Don C. Harvey as Tom Burton 
Forrest Taylor as Trader Kirk
Alyce Louis as Nita
Robert Cabal as Tawa
Tamba as Tamba

References

External links
 

1950 films
1950s English-language films
American adventure films
1950 adventure films
Eagle-Lion Films films
Films directed by Robert Emmett Tansey
American black-and-white films
1950s American films